St Mary's Anglican Girls' School is an independent, Anglican, day and boarding school for girls, located in Karrinyup, a suburb north of Perth.

Established in 1921 at West Perth, St Mary's has a non-selective enrolment policy and currently caters for more than 1470 students from Kindergarten to Year 12, including 171 boarders from Years 6 to 12.

St Mary's is affiliated with the Association of Heads of Independent Schools of Australia (AHISA), the Junior School Heads Association of Australia (JSHAA), the Association of Independent Schools of Western Australia, the Australian Boarding Schools' Association (ABSA), the Alliance of Girls' Schools Australia (AGSA), and is a member of the Independent Girls' Schools Sports Association (IGSSA).

St Mary's brother school is Hale School, located in Wembley Downs.

History
St Mary's Anglican Girls' School was founded when two private girls' schools operating in West Perth, Mrs Blanche Gouly's Girls' Grammar School and Miss Emily Hilfirty's Alexandra High School, amalgamated. The school opened on 14 September 1921, with The Reverend Charles Lawrence Riley as Acting Principal. Two other schools later joined them. The school was located at 40 Colins Street, West Perth. 

In 1964, a building appeal was launched to develop the present campus at Karrinyup. Under the guidance of the then Principal, Anne Symington (1965–1982), St Mary's operated in both West Perth and Karrinyup until 1970, when the entire school was finally situated in Karrinyup.

Facilities

St Mary's campus in Karrinyup is located on 40 acres of land.

In 1999, the school built a performing arts venue, The Lady Wardle Performing Arts Centre, with an auditorium that seats 509 people. Later, an adjoining building, The Lady Treatt Centre for Music and Dance, was built. It contains a dance studio, as well as a number of music classrooms and individual music tuition rooms.

The school grounds also boast The Sir Thomas Wardle Swimming Pool Complex, which includes a 50m heated swimming pool, paddle pool and dive pool, which was refurbished in 2011, as well as two gymnasiums (Dannatt Hall and Hearn Hall). Hearn Hall was largely funded by the Federal Government's Building Education Revolution Primary Schools for the 21st Century Program. In 2012, the school completed construction of a new library complex.

In 2005, the St Mary's Anglican Girls’ School Foundation purchased  of land in Metricup, which is located in the Margaret River Wine Region, to develop its flagship outdoor education facility, St Mary's at Metricup: The Lady Treatt Centre for Learning and Leadership, which was opened in 2008. The centre is the first of its kind for an all-girls school in Western Australia and was funded by the Foundation, as well as donations from Old Girls, parents and friends of the school. The facilities were designed and constructed in a manner which maximises their environmental sustainability. The property contains two dams, two large pastures, an eco-tent camping area, dormitory accommodation and a cottage.

Academic performance
In 2000, 2007, 2008 and 2010, St Mary's was the top-ranked school in Western Australia based on the highest number of students scoring in the top third of Western Australian Certificate of Education (WACE) results.

Principals

House system
As with most Australian schools, St Mary's utilises a house system. Each student at St Mary's is assigned to one of six houses: Craig, Hackett, Lefroy, Riley, Wardle and Wittenoom.

Through the house system, students participate in extra-curricular activities and competitions. Each house has a Year 12 prefect who, together with captains and the guidance of a house teacher, leads the house through the year's activities. Captains include - dance captain, drama captain, music captain, community captain and sports captain. There are also minor captains. Houses often compete against each other in inter-house athletics, swimming, singing and other activities, including the arts at the Creative And Performing Arts Festival (C.A.P.A.F). Throughout the year, the houses compete for the House Cup presented at the end of the year to the house with the most points awarded from inter-house competitions.

Notable alumnae

Alumnae of St Mary's Anglican Girls' School are commonly referred to as Old Girls, and become life members of the alumni association, the St Mary's Old Girls' Association on graduation. Some notable St Mary's Old Girls include:
Scherri-Lee Biggs – television presenter and Miss Universe Australia 2011
Jill Crommelin – Journalist for The West Australian, The Australian Women's Weekly, The Straits Times (Singapore) and the Sunday Independent (also attended Presbyterian Ladies' College, Perth)
Jessica Gethin – Conductor and violinist, Chief Conductor and Musical Director of the Perth Symphony Orchestra
Ashleigh Gillon – Political Reporter-Sky News, National Press Club Wallace Brown Young Achiever (2011), Most Outstanding Broadcast Journalist (2011 ASTRA Awards)
Michelle Gordon – Justice of the High Court of Australia (also attended Presbyterian Ladies' College, Perth)
Sandra Hayter – Administration Director of the Pastoralists and Graziers Association of Western Australia
Mollie Lukis OBE OAM BA Hons Dip Ed, FLAA, Hon D Litt (1911-2009) – WA State Archivist and Librarian. Awarded an OBE Order of the British Empire, Officer (Civil) 1976 "Archival work", and an OAM Medal of the Order of Australia 2004 for service to the preservation and recording of Australia's cultural heritage, particularly through the National Trust of Australia (WA) and the Toyal Western Australian Historical Society.
Ruby (Ray) Gertrude Oldham (McClintock) OAM BA UWA (1911-2005) – Landscape Architect, Journalist, Historian, Writer and campaigner for the conservation of heritage and the built environment. Made a Member of the Order of Australia in 1985 for service to the community through conservation of the man-made and natural environment.
Jan Stewart – Chief Executive Officer of Lotterywest
Jasmin Stewart – Australian rules footballer for Fremantle
Kylie Wheeler – heptathlete, silver medalist 2002 Commonwealth Games
Kaylia Stanton - Netballer
Annika Lee-Jones- Netballer

See also 
 Anglican Church of Australia
 List of schools in the Perth metropolitan area
 List of boarding schools

References

Further reading

External links 

Anglican secondary schools in Perth, Western Australia
Girls' schools in Western Australia
Educational institutions established in 1921
Boarding schools in Western Australia
Junior School Heads Association of Australia Member Schools in Western Australia
Anglican primary schools in Perth, Western Australia
1921 establishments in Australia
Alliance of Girls' Schools Australasia
Karrinyup, Western Australia